Nonyma uluguruensis is a species of beetle in the family Cerambycidae. It was described by Breuning in 1975. It is known from Tanzania.

References

Endemic fauna of Tanzania
uluguruensis
Beetles described in 1975